Xander Mobus is an American voice actor.

Career
Mobus has worked in English-language dubs of anime and video games. In 2014, he voiced the announcer and the characters Master Hand and Crazy Hand in Super Smash Bros. for Nintendo 3DS and Wii U and returned for the role in 2018's Super Smash Bros. Ultimate. He voices also Christo in Disgaea 5: Alliance of Vengeance, Dagda in Shin Megami Tensei IV: Apocalypse, and Joker in Persona 5. He voice acted various comedic requests through social media during this period, such as singing the Pokémon Theme in the Super Smash Bros. announcer's voice.

Filmography

Anime

Films

Animation

Video games

References

External links

 

American male voice actors
Living people
American male video game actors
21st-century American male actors
Year of birth missing (living people)